The genus Pyrenula consists of crustose lichens that usually grow on smooth, shaded bark. About 750 taxa have been named in the genus, although the majority of these names have been excluded from the genus as they have been transferred to other genera, or are considered synonyms. In his world key to the  Pyrenula species, published in 2012, André Aptroot accepted 169 species, including 7 not yet formally described. , Species Fungorum accepts 168 species of Pyrenula.

A

Pyrenula abditicarpa  – Brazil
Pyrenula acutispora 
Pyrenula adacta 
Pyrenula aggregataspistea  – South America
Pyrenula albonigra  – Brazil
Pyrenula andina 
Pyrenula annulata 
Pyrenula anomala 
Pyrenula arthoniotheca  – India
Pyrenula asahinae  – Japan
Pyrenula aspistea 
Pyrenula astroidea 
Pyrenula aurantiacorubra  – Brazil
Pyrenula aurantioinspersa  – South America
Pyrenula aurantiopileata  – Thailand
Pyrenula aurantiothallina  – Brazil

B
Pyrenula baileyi 
Pyrenula bataanensis 
Pyrenula bicuspidata 
Pyrenula biseptata 
Pyrenula bispora  – Brazil
Pyrenula borneensis  – Borneo
Pyrenula breutelii

C

Pyrenula caraibica  – Panama
Pyrenula celaticarpa  – Brazil
Pyrenula cerina 
Pyrenula ceylonensis 
Pyrenula chloroplaca  – Australia
Pyrenula chlorospila 
Pyrenula cinnabarina  – Brazil
Pyrenula clavatispora  – Florida
Pyrenula coccinea  – Brazil
Pyrenula concatervans 
Pyrenula confinis 
Pyrenula conspurcata 
Pyrenula convexa 
Pyrenula cornutispora  – South America
Pyrenula corticata 
Pyrenula coryli 
Pyrenula crassiuscula  – Brazil
Pyrenula cruenta 
Pyrenula cruentata 
Pyrenula cryptothelia  – Panama

D
Pyrenula darjeelingensis  – India
Pyrenula decumbens 
Pyrenula defossa 
Pyrenula dermatodes 
Pyrenula diamantinensis  – Brazil
Pyrenula duplicans

E
Pyrenula endocrocea  – Philippines

F
Pyrenula fibrata 
Pyrenula filiformis  – New Caledonia
Pyrenula finitima 
Pyrenula flavoinspersa  – South America
Pyrenula fuscoluminata 
Pyrenula fusispora 
Pyrenula fusoluminata  – Brazil

G
Pyrenula galactina 
Pyrenula gibberulosa 
Pyrenula globifera 
Pyrenula guyanensis  – South America

H
Pyrenula hawaiiensis  – Hawaii
Pyrenula hibernica  – Panama
Pyrenula howeana  – Australia

I
Pyrenula immersa 
Pyrenula indusiata 
Pyrenula infracongruens 
Pyrenula infraleucotrypa  – South America
Pyrenula inframamillana  – South America
Pyrenula infrastroidea  – South America
Pyrenula inspersicollaris  – Brazil
Pyrenula inspersoleucotrypa  – Argentina

L

Pyrenula laevigata 
Pyrenula laii  – Taiwan
Pyrenula leptaleoides  – Brazil
Pyrenula leucostoma 
Pyrenula lilacina  – Brazil
Pyrenula luteopruinosa  – Panama
Pyrenula lyonii

M

Pyrenula macrospora 
Pyrenula macularis 
Pyrenula mamillana 
Pyrenula maritima  – South America
Pyrenula mastigophora  – South Solomons
Pyrenula mastophora 
Pyrenula mastophorizans 
Pyrenula mattickiana  – South America
Pyrenula melaleuca 
Pyrenula microcarpa 
Pyrenula microcarpoides 
Pyrenula micromma 
Pyrenula microtheca 
Pyrenula minae 
Pyrenula minoides  – South America
Pyrenula minutispora  – Brazil
Pyrenula minutissima  – Iran
Pyrenula monospora  – South America
Pyrenula montocensis 
Pyrenula multicolorata  – Sri Lanka
Pyrenula muriciliata  – Mauritius
Pyrenula musaespora  – Brazil

N
Pyrenula neojaponica  – Japan
Pyrenula neolaevigata  – Japan
Pyrenula neosandwicensis 
Pyrenula nigrocincta 
Pyrenula nitida 
Pyrenula nitidans 
Pyrenula nitidella 
Pyrenula nitidula

O

Pyrenula occidentalis 
Pyrenula occulta 
Pyrenula ocellulata  – Sri Lanka
Pyrenula ochraceoflava 
Pyrenula oxysporiza

P

Pyrenula papillifera 
Pyrenula paraminarum  – South America
Pyrenula parvinuclea 
Pyrenula perfecta  – South America
Pyrenula pinguis 
Pyrenula platystoma 
Pyrenula plicata  – South America
Pyrenula porinoides 
Pyrenula prostrata  – New Zealand
Pyrenula pseudobufonia 
Pyrenula punctoleucotrypa  – Argentina
Pyrenula pyrenastroides  – New Zealand
Pyrenula pyrenuloides

Q
Pyrenula quartzitica  – Brazil
Pyrenula quassiicola

R
Pyrenula ravenelii 
Pyrenula reebiae  – North America
Pyrenula reginae  – Brazil
Pyrenula relicta 
Pyrenula rhomboidea  – Brazil
Pyrenula rinodinospora  – Papua New Guinea
Pyrenula rubroanomala 
Pyrenula rubroinspersa  – South America
Pyrenula rubrojavanica  – Java
Pyrenula rubrolateralis  – Brazil
Pyrenula rubromamillana  – Brazil
Pyrenula rubronitidula  – South America
Pyrenula rubrostigma  – South America
Pyrenula rubrostoma

S
Pyrenula sanguinea  – Brazil
Pyrenula sanguineomeandrata 
Pyrenula sanguineostiolata 
Pyrenula santensis 
Pyrenula schiffneri 
Pyrenula segregata 
Pyrenula seminuda  – South America
Pyrenula sexlocularis 
Pyrenula sexluminata 
Pyrenula shirleyana  – Australia
Pyrenula sipmanii  – South Korea
Pyrenula spissitunicata  – South Solomons
Pyrenula subcongruens 
Pyrenula subcylindrica  – India
Pyrenula subsoluta 
Pyrenula subumbilicata  – Australia
Pyrenula subvariabilis 
Pyrenula subvariolosa  – Australia
Pyrenula supracongruens 
Pyrenula supralaetior  – Brazil

T
Pyrenula tetraspora  – South America
Pyrenula thailandica  – Papua New Guinea; India; Thailand
Pyrenula tokyoensis  – Japan
Pyrenula triangularis  – South America

V
Pyrenula velatior 
Pyrenula vermicularis  – Japan
Pyrenula violaceastroidea  – Brazil
Pyrenula viridipyrgilla  – South America

W
Pyrenula warmingii 
Pyrenula welwitschii

X
Pyrenula xanthinspersa 
Pyrenula xanthoglobulifera  – Brazil
Pyrenula xanthominuta  – Australia

Former Pyrenula species

Many taxa once placed in Pyrenula have been moved to other genera or have been synonymized; these former Pyrenula species are listed here.

Pyrenula achariana  = Melanotheca achariana
Pyrenula achroopora  = Pyrenula dermatodes
Pyrenula addubitans  = Pleospora addubitans
Pyrenula aenea  = Pseudosagedia aenea
Pyrenula aethiobola  = Verrucaria aethiobola
Pyrenula albissima  = Leptorhaphis epidermidis
Pyrenula americana  = Anisomeridium americanum
Pyrenula analepta  = Arthopyrenia analepta
Pyrenula annularis  = Astrothelium annulare
Pyrenula aractina  = Hydropunctaria aractina
Pyrenula areolata  = Staurothele areolata
Pyrenula arthonioides  = Pyrenula arthoniotheca
Pyrenula biformis  = Microthelia biformis
Pyrenula canellae-albae  = Sulcopyrenula canellae-albae
Pyrenula carpinea  = Segestria carpinea
Pyrenula cartilaginea  = Astrothelium cartilagineum
Pyrenula catalepta  = Verrucaria aethiobola
Pyrenula catervaria  = Trypethelium variolosum
Pyrenula cerasi  = Arthopyrenia cerasi
Pyrenula ceratina  = Astrothelium ceratinum
Pyrenula chilensis  = Parmentaria chilensis
Pyrenula chlorotica  = Pseudosagedia chlorotica
Pyrenula cinchonae  = Constrictolumina cinchonae
Pyrenula circumrubens  = Pyrenula cruenta
Pyrenula clandestina  = Clandestinotrema clandestinum
Pyrenula clopima  = Staurothele clopima
Pyrenula coactella  = Melanothecopsis coactella
Pyrenula collospora  = Bogoriella collospora
Pyrenula diluta  = Pseudopyrenula diluta
Pyrenula discissa  = Phaeotrema discissum
Pyrenula discolor  = Ampliotrema discolor
Pyrenula elaeina   = Verrucaria elaeina
Pyrenula emergens  = Pyrenula pinguis
Pyrenula endococcoidea  = Phaeospora rimosicola
Pyrenula epidermidis  = Leptorhaphis epidermidis
Pyrenula fallaciosa  = Arthopyrenia fallaciosa
Pyrenula flaventior  = Pyrenula mastophora
Pyrenula fraxini  = Naetrocymbe fraxini
Pyrenula fuliginea  = Thelignya lignyota
Pyrenula funckii  = Verrucaria funckii
Pyrenula fusca  = Pyrenula anomala
Pyrenula gaudichaudii  = Nigrovothelium tropicum
Pyrenula gelatinosa  = Agonimia gelatinosa
Pyrenula gemmata  = Acrocordia gemmata
Pyrenula gemmifera  = Tichothecium gemmiferum
Pyrenula gibbosa  = Rimularia gibbosa
Pyrenula glabra  = Swinscowia glabra
Pyrenula glabratula  = Pyrenula dermatodes
Pyrenula guayaci  = Parapyrenis guayaci
Pyrenula harrisii  = Pyrenula occidentalis
Pyrenula henatomma  = Ocellularia henatomma
Pyrenula hyalospora  = Lithothelium hyalosporum
Pyrenula hydrela  = Verrucaria hydrela
Pyrenula infernalis  = Megalotremis infernalis
Pyrenula interjungens  = Pseudosagedia interjungens
Pyrenula kakouettae  = Pyrenula acutispora
Pyrenula kunthii  = Pyrenula mamillana
Pyrenula leucocephala  = Lecanactis abietina
Pyrenula leucoplaca  = Eopyrenula leucoplaca
Pyrenula libricola  = Pyrenula leucostoma
Pyrenula lignyota  = Thelignya lignyota
Pyrenula lithina  = Staurothele fissa
Pyrenula marcida  = Astrothelium marcidum
Pyrenula margacea  = Verrucaria margacea
Pyrenula marginata  = Pyrenula mamillana
Pyrenula martinicana  = Pyrenula caraibica
Pyrenula mastoidea  = Clathroporina mastoidea
Pyrenula megalospora  = Acrocordia megalospora
Pyrenula melanospora  = Mycomicrothelia melanospora
Pyrenula micromma  = Pyrenula occulta
Pyrenula microscopica  = Mycoporopsis microscopica
Pyrenula microthelia  = Roselliniella microthelia
Pyrenula neoculata  = Anthracothecium oculatum
Pyrenula nigrescens  = Verrucaria nigrescens
Pyrenula nitens  = Architrypethelium nitens
Pyrenula nitidella f. chlorospila  = Pyrenula chlorospila
Pyrenula obovata  = Bogoriella obovata
Pyrenula ocellata  = Polymeridium ocellatum
Pyrenula ochraceoflavens  = Pyrenula ochraceoflava
Pyrenula olivacea  = Pseudosagedia borreri
Pyrenula olivacea  = Arthopyrenia analepta
Pyrenula oxyspora  = Leptorhaphis epidermidis
Pyrenula oxyspora  = Pyrenula oxysporiza
Pyrenula papularis  = Thelidium papulare
Pyrenula perpusilla  = Endococcus rugulosus
Pyrenula pertusarioidea  = Polyblastiopsis pertusarioidea
Pyrenula planorbis  = Constrictolumina planorbis
Pyrenula punctiformis  = Naetrocymbe punctiformis
Pyrenula pupula  = Astrothelium pupula
Pyrenula pygmaea  = Muellerella pygmaea
Pyrenula quercus  = Cyrtidula quercus
Pyrenula quinqueseptata  = Polymeridium quinqueseptatum
Pyrenula quinqueseptata  = Pyrenula sexluminata
Pyrenula rhyponta  = Naetrocymbe rhyponta
Pyrenula salicis  = Arthopyrenia salicis
Pyrenula sphaeroides  = Zignoella sphaeroides
Pyrenula staurospora  = Sulcopyrenula staurospora
Pyrenula subandamanica  = Parmentaria andamanensis
Pyrenula subfarinosa  = Phaeotrema subfarinosum
Pyrenula submersa  = Verrucaria hydrela
Pyrenula subprostans  = Anisomeridium subprostans
Pyrenula subsimplex  = Melanotheca vainioensis
Pyrenula tetracerae  = Porina tetracerae
Pyrenula thelena  = Bogoriella thelena
Pyrenula tremulae  = Leptorhaphis tremulae
Pyrenula tropica  = Nigrovothelium tropicum
Pyrenula uberina  = Architrypethelium uberinum
Pyrenula umbonata  = Pyrenocarpon thelostomum
Pyrenula umbrata  = Thelotrema umbratum
Pyrenula variolosa  = Anthracothecium variolosum
Pyrenula ventosicola  = Muellerella ventosicola
Pyrenula vermicellifera  = Opegrapha vermicellifera
Pyrenula verrucosa  = Polyblastia verrucosa
Pyrenula wallrothii  = Mycomicrothelia wallrothii
Pyrenula zwackhii  = Thelidium zwackhii

Notes

References

Pyrenula